The Skinhead Hamlet is a short 1981 parody of the play Hamlet by  Richard Curtis, a co-author of Blackadder.

According to the editor's note, the play is intended "to achieve something like the effect of the New English Bible".

See also
Skinhead
Hamlet
Oulipo
Harry Mathews

References

External links
The script

Skinhead
Plays and musicals based on Hamlet
1981 plays
Parodies of literature